is a railway station in Aoi-ku, Shizuoka, Japan, operated by the Ōigawa Railway.

Lines

Station layout
The station has two opposed side platforms connected by a level crossing and a small unmanned lean-to rain shelter on the platform for passengers. The station is unattended.

Adjacent stations

|-
!colspan=5|Ōigawa Railway

Station history
Kanzō Station was opened on August 1, 1959. Located in an isolated mountain area surrounded by forests, it has very few passengers. It was built primarily to support dam construction activities in the Ōi River area in the 1960s.

Passenger statistics
In fiscal 2017, the station was used by an average of 4 passengers daily (boarding passengers only).

Surrounding area
Ōi River

See also
 List of Railway Stations in Japan

References

External links

 Ōigawa Railway home page

Stations of Ōigawa Railway
Railway stations in Shizuoka (city)
Railway stations in Japan opened in 1959